RoadKill is an open world action-adventure video game developed by Terminal Reality and published in 2003 by Midway Games. The game has been described by Midway as "the only mission-based combat driving game set in a post-apocalyptic world".

Gameplay
RoadKill is a vehicular combat game, and its gameplay is very similar to Twisted Metal, with a mission-based storyline and open-world elements inspired by Grand Theft Auto III. 

The player character assumes control of a handcrafted ground combat vehicle, performs a variety of missions to progress through the game's storyline, has an option for free-roam and is able to commit certain actions to increase their criminal ranks, such as attacking rival gangs, destroying enemy vehicles or creating havoc.

The player starts with only one vehicle to choose from, though more vehicles can be unlocked as the game progresses, either by completing certain missions or by participating in a scavenger hunt. To fit the post-apocalyptic setting, most vehicles are heavily modified and armored 1970s muscle cars, SUV's, pickup trucks and vans; all of which are armed with mounted machine guns. Additional weapons, such as RPGs, guided missiles, sniper rifles and various explosives, can be obtained or purchased throughout the game with limited ammunition. In several missions, the player is required to control the turret gun to attack enemies whilst driven around.

The main goal of the game is to increase the criminal reputation of the player in the form of "ranks". Criminal ranks can be achieved by killing or attacking rival gangs, destroying vehicles and street racing.

The game features three different cities, and each city has its own boss, whom the player engages in a one-on-one battle to unlock the next island and progress through the storyline. In order to confront the boss, the player must complete storyline missions and jobs given by other characters, most of whom are gang leaders. Storyline missions would also unlock various customizations, weapons and vehicles.

Upon completion of certain missions or side jobs, the player is able to purchase upgrades. Upgrades allow any vehicle to have its performance improved, increased ammunition capacity, or added armor for better protection against enemy attacks. Upgrades can be obtained by visiting special garages labeled as "shops", in exchange for money.

As the game progresses, the player unlocks and obtains more weapons and vehicles. Unlocked vehicles can be accessed in the player's garage, and new weapons would spawn at various points in the city or in front of the garage. Vehicles come in two types; normal and gang-affiliated. Gang-affiliated cars are mostly distinguished by their brighter colors and appear to be more customized when compared to normal cars.

Driving a gang-affiliated vehicle will cause a certain opposing gang to become hostile and continuously attack the player on sight until he escapes their territory. Likewise, driving a law enforcement vehicle will cause all gangs in the entire city to attack and attempt to kill the protagonist, making the game more challenging. Like other open-world games, the game also features a "Riot" mechanic that determines the number of Sentinels (A gang masquerading as police) that chase the player in addition to increasing severity of their crimes. When the Riot level is at maximum, the player automatically enters a "Survival" mission; where the goal is to evade and survive attacks from the Sentinels until the player loses them or picks a peace sign similar to Grand Theft Auto's police bribes.

Plot
Roadkill takes place in a fictional US county named "Hell County" after a deadly disease nicknamed The Rot broke out before the events of the game and proceeded to wreak havoc across the world. Law and order collapses and gangs roam free to engage in warfare using vehicles armed with guns and explosives throughout every community. The county is split into three cities; Lava Falls, Blister Canyon, and Paradise City.

In the aftermath of the chaos, a survivor named Mason Strong, a drifter who joined the Sentinels led by Axl who made Mason his second in command, the Sentinels proceeded to take over Paradise City and became its draconian leader with a bigger goal of eliminating the gangs in the other cities and enslaving survivors in the wastes. However, Axl was too greedy to share his newfound power and noticing Mason's increasing influence. Attempts to have Mason killed only for him to barely survive. Now out for revenge, he washes up on a beach outside Lava Falls hotwiring a car he finds work for the Daredevils, a clown-themed punk gang composed of Scottish and British immigrants led by the psychotic pimp Uncle Woody. After being accused of snitching to a rival Hispanic gang, the Gauchos. Mason ends up having to kill Woody and escape his amusement park.

The Gauchos open the way to Blister Canyon and Mason finds a new employer the flamboyant Section Eights led by General Warwick, a former military officer along with his right-hand man Gunny. Mason helps Warwick and Gunny in their war against the Talons. After killing Drake, the Talon's head lieutenant, defending Warwick's businesses, and entering an unlikely alliance with the Daredevils. Mason participates in an operation to take out Gordon Grim and his remaining Talons, making his way through the sewers and into Paradise City to join the football-themed gang South League. Mason fights their rivals the Dreg Lords and rescues their leader, Knox, from the Sentinels who teams up with Mason to take down Axl.

Mason races the Dreg Lords leader, Sage, who loses and dies. With the Dreg Lords dealt with. South League drives their full attention on to the Sentinels, weakening their defences Mason devises a plan to destroy the Sentinels' generators that power Axl's propaganda broadcasts with bomb-planted RC cars. Axl loses influence on the city. Mason heads to city hall and confronts Axl personally before engaging in a climactic battle, with Axl using a customized monster truck. Mason wrecks Axl's vehicle. Thinking Axl's dead, Mason walks away from the wreckage only for Axl (now on fire) to crawl from the wreckage where he tries to shoot Mason, only to be run over by a bus. With Axl overthrown and the South League now in control of Paradise City, Mason hears a distress call from another faction of survivors, pleading for help when learning about his reputation for "setting things right". Mason then drives away from Paradise City to points unknown to assist them.

Reception

The game received "mixed or average reviews" on all platforms according to the review aggregation website Metacritic.

References

External links
 

2003 video games
GameCube games
Midway video games
Open-world video games
PlayStation 2 games
Post-apocalyptic video games
Racing video games
Vehicular combat games
Video games developed in the United States
Xbox games
Multiplayer and single-player video games
Terminal Reality games